HG Capital may refer to:

HGGC, a middle market private equity firm based in California and Utah
H.I.G. Capital, a private equity firm based in Miami
Hg (equity firm), a middle market technology private equity firm based in London and Munich
Hg Capital Trust, a large investment fund managed by Hg